Port Caledonia (also known as Big Glace Bay) is a small community in the Canadian province of Nova Scotia, located in the Cape Breton Regional Municipality on Cape Breton Island.  It is located on the Donkin Highway, between the town of Glace Bay and the village of Donkin.

It currently has one gas station/convenience store as well as a public beach, known as the Big Glace Bay Beach.

The community received media attention in 2011 when resident Shirley Sampson appeared on the reality television program Canada's Worst Driver 7, ultimately being named the worst driver in Canada.

Demographics 

References

External links 
  Port Caledonia on Destination Nova Scotia

Communities in the Cape Breton Regional Municipality
Designated places in Nova Scotia
General Service Areas in Nova Scotia